The 2011 Chicago Cubs season was the 140th season of the Chicago Cubs franchise, the 136th in the National League and the 96th at Wrigley Field. The Cubs, under new manager Mike Quade, finished fifth in the National League Central with a record of 71–91. The Cubs displayed a patch on their uniforms to remember Cub broadcaster and player Ron Santo, who died in December 2010.

Regular season

Season standings

National League Central

Record vs. opponents

Game log

Roster

Rotation
The starting rotation for the 2011 Chicago Cubs at the beginning of the season included Ryan Dempster, Carlos Zambrano, Matt Garza, Randy Wells, and Andrew Cashner.

Transactions

Player stats

Batting

Starters by position 
Note: Pos = Position; G = Games played; AB = At bats; R = Runs scored; H = Hits; 2b = Doubles; 3B = Triples; HR = Home runs; Avg. = Batting average; RBI = Runs batted in; SB = Stolen bases

Pitchers batting 
Note: Pos = Position; G = Games played; AB = At bats; R = Runs scored; H = Hits; 2B = Doubles; 3B = Triples; HR = Home runs; RBI = Runs batted in; Avg. = Batting average; SB = Stolen bases

Pitching

Starting pitchers 
Note: W = Wins; L = Losses; ERA = Earned run average; G = Games pitched; GS = Games started; SV = Saves; IP = Innings pitched; H = Hits allowed; R = Runs allowed; ER = Earned runs allowed; BB = Walks allowed; K = Strikeouts

Relief pitchers 
Note: W = Wins; L = Losses; ERA = Earned run average; G = Games pitched; GS = Games started; SV = Saves; IP = Innings pitched; H = Hits allowed; R = Runs allowed; ER = Earned runs allowed; BB = Walks allowed; K = Strikeouts

Farm system

References

External links 
Chicago Cubs schedule for the 2011 season
2011 Chicago Cubs at Baseball Reference

Chicago Cubs
Chicago Cubs seasons
Cub